is a railway station in the town of Hirono, Fukushima, Japan, operated by East Japan Railway Company (JR East).

Lines
However, due to the Fukushima Daiichi nuclear disaster in 2011, operations were halted. Operations south of the station were resumed on June 1, 2014, however operations north past Tomioka Station remained suspended until 2017.

Station layout
The station has one island platform and one side platform connected to the station building by a footbridge. The station became Unstaffed in October 2021.

Platforms

History
Hirono Station opened on August 23, 1898. The station was absorbed into the JR East network upon the privatization of the Japanese National Railways (JNR) on April 1, 1987. On March 11, 2011, the station closed following the Great East Japan earthquake and the Fukushima Daiichi nuclear disaster. Services south were resumed on October 10, 2011.  On June 1, 2014, the station resumed operations as far as Tatsuta Station to the north. This was extended as far as Tomioka Station on October 21, 2017 and the complete line was reopened on March 14, 2020.

Passenger statistics
In fiscal 2018, the station was used by an average of 402 passengers daily (boarding passengers only).

Surrounding area
Hirono Post Office

See also
 List of railway stations in Japan

References

External links

  

Stations of East Japan Railway Company
Railway stations in Fukushima Prefecture
Jōban Line
Railway stations in Japan opened in 1898
Hirono, Fukushima